1680 Per Brahe, provisional designation , is a bright background asteroid from the central region of the asteroid belt, approximately  in diameter. It was discovered on 12 February 1942, by Finnish astronomer Liisi Oterma at Turku Observatory in Southwest Finland. The stony S-type asteroid has a rotation period of 3.4 hours. It is named after Swedish count and governor Per Brahe the Younger.

Orbit and classification 

The S-type asteroid is a non-family asteroid of the main belt's background population. It orbits the Sun in the central main-belt at a distance of 2.2–3.2 AU once every 4 years and 6 months (1,643 days; semi-major axis of 2.73 AU). Its orbit has an eccentricity of 0.18 and an inclination of 4° with respect to the ecliptic.

Naming 

This minor planet was named for Swedish count Per Brahe (1602–1680), who was Governor General of Finland in the 17th century. His prosperous legacy saw the establishment of Academia Aboensis, the first university in Finland, the construction of various new towns and many schools, and the publication of the first Finnish Bible. The official  was published by the Minor Planet Center on 1 April 1980.

Physical characteristics

Lightcurve 

In December 2012, two rotational lightcurves of Per Brahe were obtained by American astronomers Robert Stephens and Brian Warner. They gave a well-defined rotation period of 3.426 and 3.428 hours with a brightness variation of 0.13 and 0.017 magnitude, respectively. Previously, lightcurves obtained by Laurent Bernasconi and René Roy in 2005 and 2006, gave a similar period of 3.444 and 3.44 hours, respectively.().

Diameter and albedo 

According to the surveys carried out by the Infrared Astronomical Satellite IRAS, the Japanese Akari satellite, and NASA's Wide-field Infrared Survey Explorer with its subsequent NEOWISE mission, Per Brahe measures between 13.96 and 18.29 kilometers in diameter, and its surface has an albedo between 0.178 and 0.300. The Collaborative Asteroid Lightcurve Link derives a higher albedo of 0.341 and a diameter of 14.36 kilometers with an absolute magnitude of 11.0.

References

External links 
 Lightcurve plot of 1680 Per Brahe, Palmer Divide Observatory, B. D. Warner (2012)
 Asteroid Lightcurve Database (LCDB), query form (info )
 Dictionary of Minor Planet Names, Google books
 Asteroids and comets rotation curves, CdR – Observatoire de Genève, Raoul Behrend
 Discovery Circumstances: Numbered Minor Planets (1)-(5000)  – Minor Planet Center
 
 

001680
Discoveries by Liisi Oterma
Named minor planets
001680
19420212